The 1874 South West Lancashire by-election was fought on 19 March 1874.  The byelection was fought due to the incumbent Conservative MP, Richard Assheton Cross, becoming Home Secretary.  It was retained by the incumbent.

References

1874 elections in the United Kingdom
1874 in England
1870s in Lancashire
By-elections to the Parliament of the United Kingdom in Lancashire constituencies
Unopposed ministerial by-elections to the Parliament of the United Kingdom in English constituencies
March 1874 events